Casablanca, meaning "white house", is a Chilean city and commune located in Valparaíso Province, Valparaíso Region.

Geography 
The city of Casablanca is located on Route 68 between Santiago and the city of Valparaíso, at about 30 minutes southeast of Valparaíso and 50 minutes northwest of Santiago traveling by car. It is a region known for white wine grapes, especially Sauvignon blanc and Chardonnay.

Demographics
Of these, 15,209 (69.5%) lived in urban areas and 6,665 (30.5%) in rural areas. The population grew by 31.9% (5,284 persons) between the 1992 and 2002 censuses.

Administration
As a commune, Casablanca is a third-level administrative division of Chile, administered by a municipal council, which is headed by a directly elected alcalde. The 2008-2012 alcalde is Manuel Jesús Vera Delgado. The communal council has the following members:
 Rodrigo Martínez Roca
 Roberto Burgos González
 Pedro Caussade Pitté 
 Ángel Poggi Saa
 Laura Reyes Salazar
 Enrique Heck Escalante
 
Within the electoral divisions of Chile, Casablanca belongs to the 15th electoral district and 6th senatorial constituency.

Casablanca Valley wine region
The Casablanca Valley is a wine-producing region 75 km (47 mi) northwest of Santiago. It is a Denomination of Origin (DO) defined by the Chilean Appellation system, the legally defined and protected geographical indication used to identify where the grapes for a wine were grown. The valley takes its name from the commune of Casablanca and stretches roughly 30 km (19 miles) east-west from eastern border of the Valparaíso province in the Valparaíso region.
Vines were first planted here in the mid-1980s during the revitalization of the Chilean wine industry and quickly became known for its white wines, most notably Sauvignon Blanc and Chardonnay, as well as Pinot Noir, which thrives in its cooler climate.
Although the valley is located at 33°S, much closer to the Equator than any European vineyard, viticulture here is possible because of the cooling influence of the Pacific Ocean, in the shape of cool morning fog and greater cloud cover than is found elsewhere in the north of Chile.

Grape distribution by varietal

 Climate: Cool Mediterranean climate with pronounced maritime influence. 540 mm (21.2 in) of rain per year.
 Soils: clay and sandy soils.
 Primary grapes: Chardonnay, Pinot Noir, Sauvignon Blanc.
 

 
 Total hectares planted: 1,429 ha (3531 acres).

See also
 Colchagua Valley
 Maipo Valley
 Chilean wine

References

External links
  Municipality of Casablanca
 

Communes of Chile
Populated places in Valparaíso Province
Wine regions of Chile
1753 establishments in the Spanish Empire